Hackett is an unincorporated community in Wheeler Township, Lake of the Woods County, Minnesota, United States. It lies 10 miles north of Baudette.

County Road 32, County Road 70, and State Highway 172 are three of the main routes in the community.

Hackett is also located near the Rainy River and the Lake of the Woods.

The community of Wheeler's Point and Zippel Bay State Park are also nearby.

References

Further reading
 Minnesota DOT map of Lake of the Woods County (2008)

Unincorporated communities in Lake of the Woods County, Minnesota
Unincorporated communities in Minnesota